The 1974 State of the Union Address was given to the 93rd United States Congress, on Wednesday, January 30, 1974, by Richard Nixon, the 37th president of the United States. He said, "We meet here tonight at a time of great challenge and great opportunities for America. We meet at a time when we face great problems at home and abroad that will test the strength of our fiber as a nation. But we also meet at a time when that fiber has been tested, and it has proved strong.

"America is a great and good land, and we are a great and good land because we are a strong, free, creative people and because America is the single greatest force for peace anywhere in the world. Today, as always in our history, we can base our confidence in what the American people will achieve in the future on the record of what the American people have achieved in the past."  It was given in the same year America withdrew all assistance from South Vietnam during the Vietnam War. Nixon also called for the end of the Watergate investigations. He resigned months later due to the investigations.

References

Inline citations

General references
 1974 State of the Union Address (full video and audio at www.millercenter.org)

State of the Union addresses
Presidency of Richard Nixon
Speeches by Richard Nixon
93rd United States Congress
State of the Union Address
State of the Union Address
State of the Union Address
State of the Union Address
January 1974 events in the United States